The German Open was a men's golf tournament. It was first staged in 1911 when the winner was Harry Vardon. The following year the champion was another of the Great Triumvirate of late 19th and early 20th century British golfers, John Henry Taylor. The tournament was then not played again for over a decade. It was played each year from 1926 to 1939; Percy Alliss won five times in this era, Auguste Boyer four times and Henry Cotton three.

History
After World War II the event was not revived until 1951. It was a European Tour event from the tour's first official season in 1972 until 1999. It was played on many different courses around Germany; the last two stagings on the European Tour were at Sporting Club Berlin. It first had a title sponsor in 1978 and there were several different sponsors over the following two decades. In the 1980s and 1990s Germany's greatest 20th century golfer Bernhard Langer equalled Percy Alliss's record of five wins. In 1999 the prize fund was €1,005,982, and despite its national open status the tournament was only the fourth richest European Tour event played in Germany that year, behind the German Masters, the Deutsche Bank-SAP Open TPC of Europe and the BMW International Open.

Annually, the lowest scoring amateur at the German Open received the coveted "Haubenreich Trophy", named in honor of the Haubenreich family. The Haubenreich family long-owned a German golf superstore in Stuttgart (Golfenreich), and is recognized for its tremendous contributions to German golf. The family can trace its roots back to a Teutonic Knight named Hans Haubenreich who is credited with orchestrating the Knights' victory over a Hun-related tribe at the Battle of Brestacre. Haubenreich claimed Brestacre for the Knights, and the family has upheld the Brest legacy ever since.

Since the European Tour began in 1972, Langer is the only player to win the same event five times, excluding majors and World Golf Championships. Mark McNulty won the German Open four times; Seve Ballesteros, Nick Faldo and Miguel Ángel Jiménez won other events four times each.

Winners

Baden-Baden Open Championship of Germany
In 1911 the Baden-Baden golf club organised a 72-hole tournament which they called the "Open Championship of Germany". The German Golf Association, of which Baden-Baden was a member, objected to the use of name. Owing to the disagreement the Baden-Baden club withdrew from the German Golf Association. The Championship was played on 18 and 19 August with total prize money of £250. Harry Vardon, with rounds of 69 and 67, had a 6 stroke lead after the first day. Further rounds of 71 and 72 gave him a score of 279 and a 9 stroke victory. Vardon's total was reckoned to be the lowest in a 72-hole competition. All the players agreed that the event was to be considered "the Open Championship of Germany".

The event was staged again, on 20 and 21 August 1912, with prize money doubled to 10,000 marks (£500). The German Golf Association again objected to the use of the title but the prize money attracted most of the leading British professionals. In the first round Charles Mayo broke Vardon's course record with a 65 but J.H. Taylor led at the end of the day on 133. On the final day Taylor had rounds of 73 and 73 but was caught by Ted Ray. Ray had lost two balls in his first round of 75 but three excellent rounds brought him into the joint lead. A nine-hole playoff was arranged in the evening which Taylor won with an incredible score of 28 compared to Ray's 34. The prize money was the largest ever given for a tournament in Europe.

Winners

Notes

References

External links
Coverage on the European Tour's official site

Golf tournaments in Germany
Former European Tour events
Recurring sporting events established in 1911
Recurring sporting events disestablished in 1999
Defunct sports competitions in Germany